The Infatuation Is Always There is the second album by Filipino band Typecast, but their first release on a major record label. It was released in August 2004 under EMI Records Philippines on audio compact disc and produced by Raimund Marasigan and Diego Castillo.

Track listing
 Another Minute Until Ten
 Breathe Through the Glass
 Escape the Hurt
 Assertion
 Clutching
 The Infatuation Is Always There
 Out Comes the Brave
 Last Time
 21 and Counting
 Wait
 Scars of a Failing Heart
 Guilt Kill

Credits
 Lyrics: Steve Badiola and Melvin Macatiag for "Assertion" and "Scars of a Failing Heart"
 Studio recording: Sound Creation and Squid Crib Studios
 Record and mix: Raimund Marasigan
 Distribution: EMI Records Philippines

Reference

External links
Typecast Official Site

Typecast (band) albums
2004 albums